Pio da Silva Matos Júnior (born 29 November 1990) is a Mozambican professional basketball player for Ferroviário de Maputo of the Mozambican Division I Basketball League.

Matos was named league most valuable player (MVP) in 2015 and has won two championships: with Desportivo de Maputo in 2015 and with Ferroviário de Maputo in 2018. He is a regular member of the Mozambican national team and has experience at AfroBasket.

Matos has a twin brother, Augusto, who plays professional basketball in Mozambique and for the national team. Their older brother, Amarildo, also plays basketball at the professional level.

References

External links 
RealGM profile
FIBA profile

Living people
1990 births
Point guards
Mozambican men's basketball players
African Games silver medalists for Mozambique
African Games medalists in basketball
Competitors at the 2011 All-Africa Games
Ferroviário de Maputo (basketball) players